Jesse Shaw (January 7, 1800 – February 24, 1867) was a political figure in Nova Scotia. He represented Yarmouth township in the Nova Scotia House of Assembly from 1851 to 1855 as a Reformer.

Personal life 
He was born in Yarmouth, Nova Scotia, the son of Zebina Shaw and Elizabeth Brown. Shaw married Anna Tedford. He served as justice of the peace from 1854 to 1867 and also served as a member of the municipal council for Yarmouth. He died in Hebron, Nova Scotia at the age of 67.

References 
 A Directory of the Members of the Legislative Assembly of Nova Scotia, 1758-1958, Public Archives of Nova Scotia (1958)

1800 births
1867 deaths
Nova Scotia Reformer MLAs
People from Yarmouth, Nova Scotia